Church of the Transfiguration (Krivaja) is the Serbian Orthodox Church, located in Krivaja, near Šabac, and built in 1790. The church is on the list of Cultural Monuments of Great Importance.

At the beginning of the 18th century, the Church of the Transfiguration in the village of Krivaja, belonged to the Krivaja monastery, known as Krivojnik and Dobrinje in history records from the 16th century. Its present look dates back from 1790, when extensive work was performed thanks to the patronage of the noble people from that region. The one who stood out was the Duke Ranko Lazarević.

References

Serbian Orthodox church buildings in Serbia
18th-century Serbian Orthodox church buildings
Religious organizations established in 1790
Šabac
1790s establishments in Serbia